Buridrillia deroyorum is a species of sea snail, a marine gastropod mollusk in the family Pseudomelatomidae.

Description
The length of the shell attains 50 mm.

Distribution
This marine species occurs off the Galápagos Islands.

References

 Emerson, W.K. & McLean, J.H. (1992) Buridrillia deroyorum, new species from the Galapagos Islands, a living record of a Neogene turrid genus. The Nautilus, 106, 39–42

External links
 
 

deroyorum
Gastropods described in 1992